Bulb or Bulbs may refer to:

Common uses

 Bulb, a food-storage structure within some plants
 Ornamental bulb, a kind of perennial plant
 Light bulb, an electric lamp

Maritime
 Bulb keel, a type of keel
 Bulbous bow, a part that sticks out in front of a bow and below the water line

Music
 "Bulbs" (song), Van Morrison's 1974 song
 Bulb Records, a record label in Michigan
 The stage name of Misha Mansoor as a solo music artist

Science and technology
 A shortened name for Bulbophyllum, a genus of orchids
 An old fashioned term for the medulla oblongata
 Flash bulb, one type of flash used in photography
 Rubber bulb, part of an eye dropper, which is also known as a dropper or pipette
 The bulb setting on some cameras

Other uses
 Bulb Energy, a British-based energy supply company
 The Better Use of Light Bulbs Act (BULB Act), an unenacted U.S. federal legislative proposal
 Bulbs, a slang term for testicles
 Bulbus glandis

See also
 Blub (disambiguation)
 Bulbus (disambiguation), various bulb-shaped objects